

The LVG D.IV was a German fighter plane built by LVG in World War I.

Design
The D.IV was similar to the D.III in having a plywood covered semi-monocoque fuselage, but the 195hp Benz Bz IIIb V-8 direct drive engine allowed for a cleaner nose than the NAG C III engine of the D.III. It retained the single axle main undercarriage of the D.III and had a similar tail structure. The D.IV was a single bay biplane with V struts between the wings. It used landing and flying wires. Both wings were straight edged and equal chord. The upper wing had straight edges, a wider span and wider chord, the lower wing had curved tips. The pilot's cockpit was below the rear half of the upper wing, with a curved cut-out for the pilot.

Development
The first prototype of the D.IV was destroyed in a flight on 5 January 1918, when the crankshaft broke in flight, creating a fire. The second prototype made it to the first of the D-type fighter competitions at Adlershof, but was lost on 29 January 1918 when the engine caught fire, destroying the aircraft. Because both prototypes were destroyed in crashes, the D.IV program was axed.

Specifications

References

Bibliography

1910s German fighter aircraft
D 04
Rotary-engined aircraft
Biplanes
Aircraft first flown in 1918